The following elections occurred in the year 1950.

Africa 
 1950 South-West African legislative election

Asia
 1950 Iranian legislative election

Australia
 1950 New South Wales state election
 1950 Queensland state election
 1950 South Australian state election
 1950 Tasmanian state election
 1950 Western Australian prohibition referendum
 1950 Western Australian state election

Europe
 1950 Belgian general election
 1950 Danish Folketing election
 1950 Gibraltar general election
 1950 Greek legislative election
 1950 Maltese general election
 1950 Soviet Union legislative election
 1950 Turkish general election

Germany
Landtag elections in six Bundesländer: 
 18 June the Landtag of North Rhine-Westphalia, see :de:Landtagswahl in Nordrhein-Westfalen 1950
 9 July the Landtag of Schleswig-Holstein, see :de:Landtagswahl in Schleswig-Holstein 1950
 19 November the Hessischer Landtag, see :de:Landtagswahl in Hessen 1950
 19 November the Landtag of Württemberg-Baden, see :de:Landtagswahl in Württemberg-Baden 1950
 26 November the Landtag of Bavaria, see :de:Landtagswahl in Bayern 1950
 3 December the Abgeordnetenhaus of Berlin, see :de:Wahl zum Abgeordnetenhaus von Berlin 1950
 1950 Kulmbach by-election
Elections in East Germany:
 15 October the 1950 East German state elections
 19 October the 1950 East German general election

United Kingdom
 1950 Belfast West by-election
 1950 Brighouse and Spenborough by-election
 1950 Bristol South East by-election
 1950 United Kingdom general election
 List of MPs elected in the 1950 United Kingdom general election
 1950 Sheffield Neepsend by-election

North America

Canada
 1950 Brampton municipal election
 1950 Edmonton municipal election
 1950 Ottawa municipal election
 1950 Sudbury municipal election
 December 1950 Toronto municipal election
 January 1950 Toronto municipal election

Middle America 
 1950 Guatemalan parliamentary election
 1950 Guatemalan presidential election
 1950 Nicaraguan general election
 1950 Salvadoran general election

United States
 United States House of Representatives elections in California, 1950
 1950 California gubernatorial election
 1950 Maine gubernatorial election
 1950 Minnesota gubernatorial election
 1950 New Orleans mayoral election
 1950 New York state election
 United States House of Representatives elections in South Carolina, 1950
 1950 South Carolina gubernatorial election
 1950 United States House of Representatives elections

United States Senate
 1950 United States Senate elections
 United States Senate election in California, 1950
 United States Senate election in South Carolina, 1950

Oceania

Australia
 1950 New South Wales state election
 1950 Queensland state election
 1950 South Australian state election
 1950 Tasmanian state election
 1950 Western Australian prohibition referendum
 1950 Western Australian state election

South America
 1950 Brazilian legislative election
 1950 Brazilian presidential election

See also
 :Category:1950 elections

1950
Elections